A list of films produced in Turkey in 1973 (see 1973 in film):

See also
1973 in Turkey

References

Lists of Turkish films
1973